In the Old Norse written corpus, berserker were those who were said to have fought in a trance-like fury, a characteristic which later gave rise to the modern English word berserk (meaning "furiously violent or out of control"). Berserkers are attested to in numerous Old Norse sources.

Etymology

It likely means "bear-shirt" (compare the Middle English word ', meaning 'shirt'), "someone who wears a coat made out of a bear's skin". Thirteenth-century historian Snorri Sturluson interpreted the meaning as "bare-shirt", that is to say that the warriors went into battle without armour, but that view has largely been abandoned.

Early beginnings
It is proposed by some authors that the northern warrior tradition originated from hunting magic. Three main animal cults appeared: the bear, the wolf, and the wild boar.

The bas relief carvings on Trajan's column in Rome depict scenes of Trajan's conquest of Dacia in 101–106 AD. The scenes show his Roman soldiers plus auxiliaries and allies from Rome's border regions, including tribal warriors from both sides of the Rhine. There are warriors depicted as barefoot, bare-chested, bearing weapons and helmets that are associated with the Germani. Scene 36 on the column shows some of these warriors standing together, with some wearing bearhoods and some wearing wolfhoods. Nowhere else in history are Germanic bear-warriors and wolf-warriors fighting together recorded until 872 AD with Thórbiörn Hornklofi's description of the battle of Hafrsfjord when they fought together for King Harald Fairhair of Norway.
In the spring of 1870, four cast-bronze dies, the Torslunda plates, were found by Erik Gustaf Pettersson and Anders Petter Nilsson in a cairn on the lands of the farm No 5 Björnhovda in Torslunda parish, Öland, Sweden, one of them showing what appears to be a berserker ritual.

Berserkers – bear warriors

It is proposed by some authors that the berserkers drew their power from the bear and were devoted to the bear cult, which was once widespread across the northern hemisphere. The berserkers maintained their religious observances despite their fighting prowess, as the Svarfdæla saga tells of a challenge to single-combat that was postponed by a berserker until three days after Yule. The bodies of dead berserkers were laid out in bearskins prior to their funeral rites. The bear-warrior symbolism survives to this day in the form of the bearskin caps worn by the guards of the Danish monarchs.

In battle, the berserkers were subject to fits of frenzy. They would howl like wild beasts, foam at the mouth, and gnaw the rims of their shields. According to belief, during these fits, they were immune to steel and fire, and made great havoc in the ranks of the enemy. When this fever abated, they were weak and tame. Accounts can be found in the sagas.

To "go berserk" was to "hamask", which translates as "change form", in this case, as with the sense "enter a state of wild fury". Some scholars have interpreted those who could transform as a berserker as "hamrammr" or "shapestrong" – literally able to shapeshift into a bear's form. For example, the band of men who go with Skallagrim in Egil's Saga to see King Harald about his brother Thorolf's murder are described as "the hardest of men, with a touch of the uncanny about a number of them ... they [were] built and shaped more like trolls than human beings." This has sometimes been interpreted as the band of men being "hamrammr", though there is no major consensus. Another example of "hamrammr" comes from the Saga of Hrólf Kraki. One tale within tells the story of Bödvar Bjarki, a berserker who is able to shapeshift into a bear and uses this ability to fight for king Hrólfr Kraki. "Men saw that a great bear went before King Hrolf's men, keeping always near the king. He slew more men with his fore paws than any five of the king's champions."

Ulfheðnar – wolf warriors
Wolf warriors appear among the legends of the Indo-Europeans, Turks, Mongols, and Native American cultures. The Germanic wolf-warriors have left their trace through shields and standards that were captured by the Romans and displayed in the armilustrium in Rome.

Frenzy warriors wearing the skins of wolves called Ulfheðnar ("Wolf-Coats"; singular Ulfheðinn), are mentioned in the Vatnsdæla saga, the Haraldskvæði and the Grettis saga and are consistently referred to in the sagas as a group of berserkers, always presented as the elite following of the first Norwegian king Harald Fairhair. They were said to wear the pelt of a wolf over their chainmail when they entered battle. Unlike berserkers, direct references to ulfheðnar are scant. Egil's Saga features a man called Kveldulf (Evening-Wolf) who is said to have transformed into a wolf at night. This Kveldulf is described as a berserker, as opposed to an ulfheðinn. Ulfheðnar are sometimes described as Odin's special warriors: "[Odin's] men went without their mailcoats and were mad as hounds or wolves, bit their shields...they slew men, but neither fire nor iron had effect upon them. This is called 'going berserk'." In addition, the helm-plate press from Torslunda depicts a scene of Odin with a berserker with a wolf pelt and a spear as distinguishing features: "a wolf-skinned warrior with the apparently one-eyed dancer in the bird-horned helm, which is generally interpreted as showing a scene indicative of a relationship between berserkgang ... and the god Odin".

"Jöfurr" – proposed boar warriors
Swine played a central role in Germanic paganism, featuring in both mythology and religious practice, particularly in association with the Vanir, Freyr and Freyja. It has been proposed that similar to berserkers, warriors could ritually transform into boars so as to gain strength, bravery and protection in battle. It has been theorised that this process was linked to the wearing of boar helmets as a ritual costume.

Attestations
Berserkers appear prominently in a multitude of other sagas and poems. Many earlier sagas portrayed berserkers as bodyguards, elite soldiers, and champions of kings. This image would change as time passed and sagas would begin to describe berserkers as boasters rather than heroes, and as ravenous men who loot, plunder, and kill indiscriminately. Within the sagas, Berserkers can be narrowed down to four different types. The King's Berserkr, the Hall-Challenging Berserkr, the Hólmgangumaðr, and the Viking Berserkr. Later, by Christian interpreters, the berserker was viewed as a "heathen devil".

The earliest surviving reference to the term "berserker" is in Haraldskvæði, a skaldic poem composed by Thórbiörn Hornklofi in the late 9th century in honor of King Harald Fairhair, as ulfheðnar ("men clad in wolf skins"). This translation from the Haraldskvæði saga describes Harald's berserkers:

The "tasters of blood" (a kenning) in this passage are thought to be ravens, which feasted on the slain.

The Icelandic historian and poet Snorri Sturluson (1179–1241) wrote the following description of berserkers in his Ynglinga saga:

King Harald Fairhair's use of berserkers as "shock troops" broadened his sphere of influence.  Other Scandinavian kings used berserkers as part of their army of hirdmen and sometimes ranked them as equivalent to a royal bodyguard. It may be that some of those warriors only adopted the organization or rituals of berserk Männerbünde, or used the name as a deterrent or claim of their ferocity.

Emphasis has been placed on the frenzied nature of the berserkers, hence the modern sense of the word "berserk". However, the sources describe several other characteristics that have been ignored or neglected by modern commentators. Snorri's assertion that "neither fire nor iron told upon them" is reiterated time after time. The sources frequently state that neither edged weapons nor fire affected the berserks, although they were not immune to clubs or other blunt instruments. For example:

Similarly, Hrolf Kraki's champions refuse to retreat "from fire or iron". Another frequent motif refers to berserkers blunting their enemy's blades with spells or a glance from their evil eyes. This appears as early as Beowulf where it is a characteristic attributed to Grendel. Both the fire eating and the immunity to edged weapons are reminiscent of tricks popularly ascribed to fakirs.
In 1015, Jarl Eiríkr Hákonarson of Norway outlawed berserkers. Grágás, the medieval Icelandic law code, sentenced berserker warriors to outlawry. By the 12th century, organised berserker war-bands had disappeared.

The Lewis Chessmen, found on the Isle of Lewis (Outer Hebrides, Scotland) but thought to be of Norse manufacture, include berserkers depicted biting their shields.

Theories

Scholar Hilda Ellis-Davidson draws a parallel between berserkers and the mention by the Byzantine emperor Constantine VII (CE 905–959) in his book De cerimoniis aulae byzantinae ("Book of Ceremonies of the Byzantine court") of a "Gothic Dance" performed by members of his Varangian Guard (Norse warriors in the service of the Byzantine Empire), who took part wearing animal skins and masks: she believes this may have been connected with berserker rites.

The rage the berserker experienced was referred to as berserkergang (Berserk Fit/Frenzy or The Berserk movement). This condition has been described as follows:

When Viking villages went to war in unison, the berserkers often wore special clothing, for instance furs of a wolf or bear, to indicate that this person was a berserker, and would not be able to tell friend from foe when in "bersærkergang". In this way, other allies would know to keep their distance.

Some scholars propose that certain examples of berserker rage had been induced voluntarily by the consumption of drugs such as the hallucinogenic mushroom or massive amounts of alcohol. This is much debated but the theory is further supported by the discovery of seeds belonging to the plant henbane Hyoscyamus niger in a Viking grave that was unearthed near Fyrkat, Denmark in 1977. An analysis of the symptoms caused by Hyoscyamus niger are also similar to the symptoms ascribed to the berserker state, which suggest it may have been used to generate their warlike mood. Other explanations for the berserker's madness that have been put forward include self-induced hysteria, epilepsy, or mental illness, among other causes.

One theory of the berserkers suggests that the physical manifestations of the berserker alongside their rage was a form of self-induced hysteria. Initiated before battle through a ritualistic process, also known as effektnummer, which included actions such as shield-biting and animalistic howling.

Jonathan Shay makes an explicit connection between the berserker rage of soldiers and the hyperarousal of posttraumatic stress disorder. In Achilles in Vietnam, he writes:

It has been suggested that the berserkers' behavior inspired the legend of the werewolf.

In popular culture

At one point in the popular manga series Berserk (manga) by Kentaro Miura, the protagonist obtains a magical weapon called "the berserker armor" that gives him super-human strength when experiencing rage, with the inconvenience of entering a sort of trance in which he cannot feel pain, thus endangering himself while in that state.
John Nord wrestled in the WWE as the "Berzerker".
In The Witcher 3: Wild Hunt, berserkers appear as humans that have transformed into bears. Berserkers also appear as cards in the in-game side game Gwent.
In Assassin's Creed Valhalla, berserkers are mentioned throughout the game and the pre-order bonus quest "The Way of the Berserker" is centered around a berserker named Bjorn.
 The berserker is often used in many different forms of media as an archetype, such as in video games, with some examples being Path of Exile, TERA, and MapleStory 2.
 Gears of War features an enemy known as the Locust. Within the Locust caste are drones, with the females named berserkers.
 For Honor features a playable character named Berserker.
Thor Odinson has been depicted with a berserker rage like state called “Warrior's Madness” which enhances his strength, speed, durability and stamina for months though Thor has very little control in this state.
Falling Skies is a science fiction series produced by Steven Spielberg where a post-massacre remnant society of humans offers armed resistance to an alien invasion. A small faction of mercenary fighters within the human cohort that is at the center of the series' action is known as The Berzerkers.
In the 2022 film The Northman, the main character Amleth (Alexander Skarsgård) is raised as part of a group of berserkers. A berserker ritual is also featured in the film.

See also
 Barbarian
 Kóryos
 Furor Teutonicus
 Hyoscyamus niger
 Hysterical strength
 Excited delirium

References

Bibliography

 
 
 
 

 
 Merkelbach, Rebecca. 2018.  Eigi í mannligu eðli: Shape, Monstrosity and Berserkism in the Sagas of Icelanders. Shapeshifters in Medieval North Atlantic Literature, Santiago Francisco Barreiro and Luciana Mabel Cordo Russo, eds.,  83–106. Amsterdam University Press.

External links

Vandle helmet with bronze plates depicting wild Boar warriors, the Svinfylking 8th Century CE. Valsgarde, Sweden
Berserkene – hva gikk det av dem? (Jon Geir Høyersten: Journal of the Norwegian Medical Association)
Berserkergang (Viking Answer Lady) 

Berserkers-wolf-people

Animal festival or ritual
Bears in human culture
Bears in religion
Fantasy tropes
Legendary Norsemen
Norse paganism
Rage (emotion)
Stock characters
Therianthropy
Viking warfare
Viking warriors
Wolves in folklore, religion and mythology
Wolves in human culture